Glycine N-carboxyanhydride is an organic compound with the formula HNCH(CO)2O.  A colorless solid, it is the product of the phosgenation of glycine. Glycine N-carboxyanhydride is the simplest member of the amino acid N-carboxyanhydrides. It is also the parent of the 2,5-Oxazolidinedione family of heterocycles.

Other derivatives
2,5-Oxazolidinediones can also be prepared from Schiff base derivatives of amino acids.

See also
2,4-Oxazolidinedione, parent ring found in a variety anticonvulsant drugs.

References

Oxazolidinediones